The Ride is a 2022 American thriller drama directed by Adam Marino and starring Savanah Joeckel, Mark Justice, Paul Sorvino (in his final screen appearance), Dee Dee Sorvino, D. B. Sweeney and Dean Cain.

Cast
Savanah Joeckel as Angela Jones
Mark Justice as Laz Jones
Paul Sorvino as Paulie Amato
Dee Dee Sorvino as Dee Amato
D. B. Sweeney as Gas Station Owner
Dean Cain as Mark Smith

Production
The film was shot in Jacksonville, Florida.

Release
The Ride premiered at the Southeast Regional Film Festival in Jacksonville on January 15, 2022. It was released in Beverly Hills on October 19, 2022.

References

External links
 

Films shot in Jacksonville, Florida